Ricardo Cruzat Hurtado (1845–1905) was a Chilean lawyer and politician. He was minister of foreign affairs (1891) under President Jose Manuel Balmaceda and minister of finance (1902–1903). He was a member of the Chilean Chamber of Deputies from 1894–1897.

Political activities
He was a member of the Liberal Democratic Party, contributing to their organization. He was Minister of Foreign Affairs, under the administration of President José Manuel Balmaceda (May 1891).
Elected Deputy for La Serena, Coquimbo and Elqui (1894–1897), integrated in this period the Standing Committee of Constitution, Law and Justice .
In 1902 he was director of Nitrate Company of Antofagasta and was appointed Minister of Finance (1902–1903).

References
Urzúa Valenzuela, Germán (1992). "Historia Política de Chile y su Evolución Electoral" (3.ª edición). Santiago, Chile: Editorial Jurídica de Chile.
Castillo Infante, Fernando (1996). "Diccionario Histórico y Biográfico de Chile" (6.ª edición). Santiago, Chile: Editorial Zig-Zag.

1845 births
1905 deaths
People from Santiago
Liberal Democratic Party (Chile, 1893) politicians
Foreign ministers of Chile
Chilean Ministers of Finance
Deputies of the Constituent Congress of Chile (1891)
Deputies of the XXIV Legislative Period of the National Congress of Chile